The 1993 London–Sydney Marathon, officially Lombard London–Sydney Marathon was the third running of the London–Sydney Marathon. The rally took place between 17 April and 16 May 1993. The event covered 10,000 miles (16,000 km) through Europe, Asia and Australia. It was won by Francis Tuthill and Anthony Showell in a Porsche 911.

Background

Nick Brittan, who was a competitor in the original event in 1968, decided to organise a modern London to Sydney Marathon featuring pre-1970 cars to commemorate the 25th anniversary of the original event being held in 1968 through his company, Trans World Events, who would go on to organise similar endurance events over the next decade. 
He managed to persuaded 25 of the original 1968 competitors to take part in the 1993 event which included the 1968 winner, Andrew Cowan, who had the Hillman Hunter that he won the 1968 event in, on loan to him by the Scottish Automobile Club Museum and former British Rally Champion Roger Clark.
The route would see competitors cross Europe and Asia in the first eleven days of the event before the cars would be airlifted from Turkey to India with competitors driving through the country for the next seven days before being airlifted to Australia for the last ten days of the rally. The event was to have three major differences comparing to the original event in 1968. Firstly, the changing political climate in the Middle East meant that several countries such as Iran and Afghanistan were now out of bounds, although in Europe, Turkey and Australia much of the original route was retraced from the original. Secondly, the old scheduled open road sections would be replaced with more modern timed special stages for safety reasons. Finally, with the demise of the great passenger liners there would be no great voyage across the Indian Ocean from India to Australia, Brittan and TWE instead hired two Antonov An-124 cargo planes to take the vehicles from India to Australia.

Results

References

Rally raid races
Rally racing series
London-Sydney Marathon